The Syrian–Palestinian Congress, also known as the Syria-Palestine Congress or the Syro-Palestinian Congress was an organisation founded on 25 August 1921 in Geneva  by a group of Syrian and Palestinian exiles under the auspices of the Syrian Unity Party. The main aim of the congress was to try to influence the terms of the proposed League of Nations mandate over the region. It was one of a number of congresses held by Arab nationists following the Arab Congress of 1913.

The formation of the congress followed the July 1919 "Pan-Syrian" Syrian National Congress. The addition of Palestine to the name followed the Franco-British boundary agreement of December 1920 which formally defined the territory of Palestine out of the region viewed by the Pan-Syrian nationalists as Greater Syria.

On 21 September, after twenty-six days of discussion, the joint congress issued a public statement to the League of Nations demanding:

Participants
 Michel Lotfallah (President)
 Rashid Rida (Vice President)
 +Haj Toufic Hammad (Vice President)
 Emir Shakib Arslan (Secretary General)
 Toufic El-Yazigi (Assistant Secretary General)
 Wahba El-Issa
 Riad El-Solh
 Salah Ezzeddine
 +Shibli El-Jamal
 Ihsan El-Jabri
 George Youssef Salem
 Taan Al-Imad
 +Amin Bey Al-Tamimi
 Najib Choucair
 Toufic Fayed
 Suleiman Kanaan
 Shukri al-Quwatli
 Abd al-Rahman Shahbandar

+ These three delegates traveled to Geneva from London, where they were part of a delegation authorized by the Fourth congress of the Palestine Arab Congress.

External references
 The Ideas of Amir Shakib Arslan: Before and After the Collapse of the Ottoman Empire, Mahmoud Haddad
 Arabic translation of the September 1921 "Call to the Second General Assembly of the League of Nations" addressed by the Syrian-Palestinian Congress
 Photograph of the Syro-Palestinian Congress meeting in Geneva from August 25 to September 21, 1921
 Congrès Syrio-Palestinien: (Genève 25 août - 21 sept. 1921): Appel adressé à la 2me Assemblée générale de la Société des Nations
 Syrians Present Grievances to the League, New York Times, August 31 1922
 List of signatories

References

Bibliography

1921 in Mandatory Syria
1921 in Mandatory Palestine